Matthew Charles Lund (born 21 November 1990) is an professional footballer who plays as a midfielder for Salford City.

Lund began his career with English club Stoke City in the Premier League, where he failed to make his debut. He instead made his senior debut while a loan spell at Hereford United in November 2010. Further loan spells took Lund to Oldham Athletic and Bristol Rovers (twice) and he ended 2011–12 on loan at Southend United. In July 2013, Lund made a permanent transfer to then-League Two side Rochdale, after being released by Stoke City. He went on to enjoy an excellent season, scoring nine goals from midfield to help Rochdale to promotion.

Born in England, Lund has played internationally for the Northern Ireland national team six times at the under-21 level and three times at senior level.

Club career

Stoke City
Lund started his career at Crewe Alexandra's Academy. He joined Stoke City in the summer of 2009 along with fellow Crewe teammate Ben Marshall. Unlike Marshall who went out on loan Lund stayed at Stoke and played in the reserve team. He had a number of impressive displays in the reserve squad most notably against Portsmouth where Lund scored three times and created two. His first appearance on the Stoke bench came in a Premier League game against Burnley in February 2010.

Lund joined Jamie Pitman at Hereford United on a months loan on 23 November 2010 where he will make his professional debut. He made his debut in a 2–2 draw with Lincoln City in the FA Cup. He made his league debut in a 1–0 loss to Bradford City on 11 December 2010.

In July 2011 Lund joined League One side Oldham Athletic on loan until 21 November 2011. Lund made his debut for the club with an assist in a 1–0 pre season victory against Fleetwood Town and his competitive club debut on the first day of the 2011–12 season, starting the Football League match against Sheffield United. He was recalled by Stoke from his loan at Oldham on 9 September as Lund was not getting played in the first team.

On 30 January 2012 Lund joined Bristol Rovers on a months loan, scoring his first two senior goals for his final loan appearance for the club. In July 2012 he re-joined Bristol Rovers on loan following a successful spell. He scored on his final appearance of his second loan spell in a 2–1 win over Plymouth Argyle. He joined Southend United on loan in February 2013. He played 13 games for the Shrimpers scoring once against Northampton Town. He was released by Stoke at the end of the 2012–13 season.

Rochdale
Lund joined Rochdale on 21 June 2013 signing a two-year contract.

On 31 October 2014, Lund signed a contract extension tying him to the club until summer 2016.

On 17 December 2016, Lund scored his first career hat-trick, scoring all three of Rochdale's goals in a 3–2 win against Northampton Town.

Burton Albion
On 19 May 2017, Lund joined Burton Albion signing a two-year contract after his four-year spell at Rochdale. He scored his first goal for Burton in a 3–2 EFL Cup win against Oldham Athletic on 9 August 2017.

On 26 January 2018, Matty joined Bradford City on loan for the rest of the season.

Scunthorpe United
On 3 August 2018, Matty joined Scunthorpe United for an undisclosed fee, signing a two-year deal with the club.

Rochdale Return
On 31 January 2020, Lund returned to Rochdale for an undisclosed fee, signing a 18-month contract.

Salford City
On 1 July 2021, Lund joined League Two side Salford City on a free transfer after turning down a new contract with Rochdale, signing a one-year deal with the option of a second. On 11 September, he scored his first goal for the club, scoring a last minute winner to beat Bradford City 1–0.

International career
Lund was called up to the Northern Ireland Under 21 side for the first time in February 2011. He was called up to the senior Northern Ireland squad for a UEFA Euro 2016 qualifier against Romania in November 2014. He was called up again in August 2016 for a 2018 FIFA World Cup qualifier against the Czech Republic.

Style of play
Ian Henderson has described him as a player that is a "real good passer of the ball, he moves with the ball over distance, he can then chip in with a fair few goals too, a wise head on himself as well", and has described him as "exceptional" both offensively and defensively.

Career statistics

Club

International

References

External links

1990 births
Living people
Association footballers from Northern Ireland
Northern Ireland under-21 international footballers
Northern Ireland international footballers
English footballers
English people of Northern Ireland descent
Association football midfielders
Crewe Alexandra F.C. players
Stoke City F.C. players
Hereford United F.C. players
Oldham Athletic A.F.C. players
Bristol Rovers F.C. players
Southend United F.C. players
Rochdale A.F.C. players
Burton Albion F.C. players
Bradford City A.F.C. players
Scunthorpe United F.C. players
Salford City F.C. players
English Football League players